The 1956–57 Serie A season was the 23rd season of the Serie A, the top level of ice hockey in Italy. Six teams participated in the league, and SG Cortina won the championship.

Regular season

External links
 Season on hockeytime.net

1956–57 in Italian ice hockey
Serie A (ice hockey) seasons
Italy